Drug Safety is a peer-reviewed medical journal covering pharmacoepidemiology and pharmacovigilance. It was established in 1986 as Medical Toxicology, and was renamed Medical Toxicology and Adverse Drug Experience in 1987. It obtained its current name in 1990. It is  published by Springer Nature under the Adis Reprint, and is the official journal of the International Society of Pharmacovigilance. The editor-in-chief is Nitin Joshi. According to the Journal Citation Reports, the journal has a 2021 impact factor of  5.228.

References

External links

Drug safety
Pharmacology journals
Publications established in 1986
Springer Science+Business Media academic journals
English-language journals
Academic journals associated with international learned and professional societies of Europe
Monthly journals